James Craig Brown  (born 1 July 1940) is a Scottish former professional football player and manager. After his playing career with Rangers, Dundee and Falkirk was curtailed by a series of knee injuries, Brown entered management with Clyde in 1977. Brown then coached various Scotland youth teams until he was appointed Scotland manager in 1993. He held this position until 2001, the longest tenure for a Scotland manager, and they qualified for the UEFA Euro 1996 and 1998 FIFA World Cup tournaments. Brown later managed Preston North End, Motherwell and Aberdeen. He retired from management in 2013 and was appointed a non-executive director of Aberdeen. Brown was awarded the CBE in 1999 for services to football.

Early life
Brown was born in Glasgow, but brought up with two younger brothers in Troon, Rutherglen and Hamilton, moving with his father's career as a physical education teacher, later a senior advisor on the subject. He was a keen golfer as well as watching Queen's Park and Hamilton Academical matches.

Playing career

Early career
Educated at the former Hamilton Academy, Brown played for the school in Scottish schools competitions and in youth international teams, before joining Rangers in 1957, being considered a top prospect; he was initially farmed out to Coltness United to gain experience, and was selected for the Scotland Junior squad. He failed to find a regular first team place at Rangers, with his progress halted by a knee injury and the arrival of Jim Baxter who played in the same position, and moved to Dundee on loan in October 1960.

Dundee
Brown was the first signing of Dundee manager Bob Shankly. Although knee surgery meant he barely played for the first team during his loan, the move was made permanent in the summer of 1961. Brown always traveled with the Dundee first team squad but this was before substitutes were commonly used. Thus he didn't make a competitive appearance until November 1961, then waited until February 1962 for his league debut when captain Bobby Cox was injured. Brown played in nine consecutive league games before becoming injured himself on 31 March in a 3–2 win against bottom placed Stirling Albion. Dundee won the Scottish league title that season and Brown's nine appearances entitled him to a medal. Brown stayed at Dundee for four and a half injury-affected years, making 16 total appearances for the Dark Blues but playing no active part in the club's European Cup run, or the 1964 Scottish Cup Final which they lost to Rangers. During that time he also completed a course in physical education and primary teaching at Jordanhill College, and was also a member of the pop music group Hammy and the Hamsters formed by six Dundee players.

Falkirk
Brown signed for Falkirk in 1965 on a part-time basis and went on to make 42 total appearances at Brockville. He was released in 1967 and signed for Stranraer, but his injured knee almost immediately required him to call time on his playing career, and he returned the signing-on fee he had received from the club.

Managerial career

Clyde
Brown quickly showed a keen interest in being involved in the coaching side of football and he became assistant manager of Motherwell in 1974. He got his first managerial job as part-time manager of Clyde in 1977, where he spent ten seasons – winning the Second Division championship in his first season – whilst also working as a primary school head teacher then a lecturer in primary education at Craigie College, Ayr.

Scotland

Brown returned to football full-time in 1986 when SFA Secretary Ernie Walker appointed him as assistant manager to the national men's senior team. Brown was also in charge of Scotland's youth teams. In 1989, he coached Scotland's Under-16s to the final of the 1989 FIFA U-16 World Championship and three years later coached the under-21s to the semi finals of the 1992 UEFA Under-21 Championship.

Brown was appointed as manager of Scotland in December 1993, having been caretaker manager for the games against Italy and Malta. Brown took Scotland to Euro 96 and the 1998 World Cup, but resigned in October 2001, having failed to take Scotland to Euro 2000 and the 2002 World Cup. He was replaced by German Berti Vogts.

Under Brown, Scotland beat England in the last Euro Championship qualifier at the old Wembley in 1999 by one goal to nil, although they lost the tie 2–1 on aggregate. He took charge of Scotland for 70 international matches, more than any other Scotland manager.

Preston North End
Brown then had a spell in club management when he was appointed as manager of Preston North End in April 2002, but left by mutual consent on 29 August 2004 after a poor start to the league campaign. He later had a brief spell as football consultant at Derby County under former protégé Billy Davies, helping them win promotion to the Premier League in 2006–07.

In October 2008, sixty eight year old Brown was linked to the vacant managerial position with Scottish First Division side Dundee, but the job went to Jocky Scott.

Motherwell
On 28 December 2009, it was announced that Brown would be taking charge of Motherwell, with Archie Knox as his assistant. Brown and Knox established Motherwell in the top six of the Scottish Premier League during their time in charge.

Aberdeen
Brown, who was working without a contract at Motherwell, rebuffed an initial approach by Aberdeen on 8 December 2010. He then had a change of heart after a second approach was made, and was appointed Aberdeen manager on 10 December.

On 14 March 2013, Brown announced he was retiring from football management at the end of the 2012–13 season. His retirement date was brought forward when Derek McInnes was appointed to the position on 5 April, with Brown accepting a position on the Aberdeen board.

Personal life 
Brown was awarded an honorary Doctorate of Arts by Abertay University in 2001.

He has two brothers: Jock was a football commentator, and Bob was the minister at Queen's Cross Parish Church in Aberdeen from 1984 until his retirement in 2008. Brown's grandson and namesake, Craig, plays for Stirling University in the Lowland League.

Managerial statistics

Honours

Player
Dundee
Scottish league champion: 1961–62

Manager
Clyde
Scottish Second Division (2): 1977–78, 1981–82

 Scotland U21
 UEFA under-21 Euros: Bronze 1992
 Toulon Tournament: Bronze 1991, 1993

Personal
Scottish Premier League manager of the month (4): January 2010, February 2010, January 2012 and October 2012

References

External links
Clyde FC Hall of Fame profile

1940 births
Living people
People educated at Hamilton Academy
Scottish footballers
Association football wing halves
Rangers F.C. players
Dundee F.C. players
Falkirk F.C. players
Scottish Football League players
Scottish football managers
Clyde F.C. managers
Preston North End F.C. managers
Derby County F.C. non-playing staff
Motherwell F.C. managers
Motherwell F.C. non-playing staff
Scottish Premier League managers
Aberdeen F.C. managers
Scotland national football team managers
UEFA Euro 1996 managers
1998 FIFA World Cup managers
Alumni of the Open University
Scottish Football Hall of Fame inductees
Scottish Football League managers
Footballers from Hamilton, South Lanarkshire
Scotland national under-21 football team managers
Commanders of the Order of the British Empire
Directors of football clubs in Scotland
Scottish schoolteachers
Scotland junior international footballers
Alumni of the University of Strathclyde
Newmains United Community F.C. players
Scottish Junior Football Association players